Račeva is a dispersed settlement in a valley of the same name southeast of Žiri in the Upper Carniola region of Slovenia. Račeva Creek runs along the valley and is a tributary of the Poljane Sora River.

History
During the Second World War, the border between territory annexed to Nazi Germany and Fascist Italy ran along Račeva Creek. In 1941, the Germans demolished the water-powered Debenc Mill during demarcation of the border.

References

External links

Račeva on Geopedia

Populated places in the Municipality of Žiri